Jestřabí may refer to:

Jestřabí (Zlín District), a village and municipality in Zlín District in the Zlín Region, Czech Republic
Jestřabí v Krkonoších, a village and municipality in Semily District in the Liberec Region, Czech Republic
Kuřimské Jestřabí, a village and municipality in Brno-Country District in the South Moravian Region, Czech Republic
Pernštejnské Jestřabí, a village and municipality in Brno-Country District in the South Moravian Region, Czech Republic
Jestřabí Lhota, a village and municipality in Kolín District in the Central Bohemian Region, Czech Republic

See also 
 Jestřebí (disambiguation)